Orest Lenczyk (born 28 December 1942) is a Polish football manager and former player.

Playing career
Lenczyk was born in Sanok. He was a player in lower divisions teams such as Sanoczanka Sanok, Stomil Poznań, Sleza Wrocław, and Moto-Jelcz Olawa. At the age of 28, Lenczyk ended his career as a footballer, and began working as a coach.

Managerial career
At first, Lenczyk was coached in several teams of southeastern Poland, in 1975 finding a job at Wisła Kraków, where he was assistant. Next year, he became a coach of Wisla's first team, winning Championship of Poland in the 1977/78 season. Furthermore, Lenczyk's Wisla got to the quarter-finals of the 1978–79 European Cup, beating Club Brugge, and Zbrojovka Brno, only to lose to the runner-up, Malmö FF. Lenczyk worked for Wisla for several more seasons (1984–1985, 1994, 2000–2001), and during his last season in Kraków, he won promotion to the second round of UEFA Cup, after eliminating Real Saragossa.

In October 2005, he got a job at GKS Bełchatów. After first, difficult season, his team was Polish runner-up, with such players, as Radosław Matusiak, Pawel Strak, Lukasz Gargula, and Piotr Lech. He was fired in March 2008, after five defeats in a row. On 16 April 2009, he was named head coach of Zaglebie Lubin, winning promotion to the Ekstraklasa. In August 2009, Lenczyk became the coach of Cracovia, replacing Artur Platek. After problems with Cracovia management he came to terms with the higher-ups and dissolve his contract.

On 27 September 2010, he was named the successor for Ryszard Tarasiewicz by Śląsk Wrocław. The team became a runner-up in Polish League in 2010/2011 season. In season 2011/2012 he won the Polish title with Śląsk Wrocław.

Honours
 Championship of Poland (1978, 2012),
 Quarter-final of the 1978–79 European Cup,
 Third place in Poland (1979–1980), with Śląsk Wrocław,
 Third place in Poland (1982–1983), with Ruch Chorzów,
 Second place in Poland (2006–2007), with GKS Bełchatów,
 Promotion to Ekstraklasa (2008–2009), with Zaglebie Lubin,
 Second place in Poland (2010–2011), with Śląsk Wrocław,
 Manager of the year 1990 and 2006, according to Pilka Nozna weekly.
 Manager of the season 2010-2011, according to Polish Coaches Association

References

See also

1942 births
Living people
People from Sanok
Polish footballers
Polish football managers
Karpaty Krosno managers
Ruch Chorzów managers
Wisła Kraków managers
MKS Cracovia managers
Śląsk Wrocław managers
Pogoń Szczecin managers
GKS Bełchatów managers
GKS Katowice managers
Sportspeople from Podkarpackie Voivodeship
Association footballers not categorized by position